Visionaries is the plural of visionary. Visionaries may also refer to:

 Visionaries (hip hop group), a hip hop group from Los Angeles
 Visionaries: Knights of the Magical Light, an American media franchise marketed in the late 1980s
 Visionaries: Small Solutions to Enormously Large Problems, an Australian documentary film series broadcast in 1989, 1990, and 1993
 Visionaries with Antanas Mockus, a Colombian political party
 The Visionaries (film), a 1969 Italian film
 Visionaries (2001 film), a Spanish romantic and religious drama film

See also 
 Visionary (disambiguation)